Paolo Guadagnini (1908–1942) was a violin maker, the last member of the famous Guadagnini family of luthiers, who worked in Turin. He died as a soldier in the Second World War.

References 

1942 deaths
Italian musical instrument makers
Bowed string instrument makers
Italian military personnel killed in World War II
1908 births
20th-century Italian musicians